Algeria competed at the 1983 World Championships in Athletics in Helsinki, Finland, from August 7 to 14, 1983.

Results

Men
Track and road events

Field events

Combined events – Decathlon

Women
Combined events – Heptathlon

References

Nations at the 1983 World Championships in Athletics
World Championships in Athletics
1983